HSwMS M 20 was a minesweeper that served in the Swedish Navy. Built in 1941 of mahogany on a steel frame, M 20 represents legendary shipbuilding and was in service from 1941 until 2005.

Decommissioned in 2005 she is now owned by SMM (Swedish Maritime Museums) and operated and maintained by the association "Föreningen M 20".

External links
 Föreningen M 20 

Mine warfare vessels of the Swedish Navy
World War II minesweepers
1941 ships
Museum ships in Sweden
Ships built in Sweden